The four Symphonic Dances Op. 64 by the Norwegian composer Edvard Grieg were written c. 1896 and published in 1897.

They draw their inspiration from the earlier folk works collected by Ludvig Mathias Lindeman.

Dance No. 1, G major, Allegro moderato e marcato
Dance No. 2, A major, Allegretto grazioso
Dance No. 3, D major, Allegro giocoso
Dance No. 4, A minor, Andante - Allegro risoluto

External links
 EDVARD GRIEG Symphonic Dances, Op. 64 (Vincent Osborn © 2018) 
 

Suites by Edvard Grieg
1896 compositions
Compositions for symphony orchestra